Many words in the English lexicon are made up of Latinate words; that is, words which have entered the English language from a Romance language (usually Anglo-Norman), or were borrowed directly from Latin. Quite a few of these words can further trace their origins back to a Germanic source (usually Frankish), making them cognate with many native English words from Old English, yielding etymological twins. Many of these are Franco-German words, or French words of Germanic origin.

Below is a list of Germanic words, names and affixes which have come into English via Latin or a Romance language.

A

-ard
aband
abandominium
abandon
abandonee
abandum
abannation
abannition
abet
abettal
abettor
abut
abutment
affray
afraid
al fresco
Alan
Albert
Alemanni
Alice
Aline
Alison
allegiance
Allen
allodial
allodium
allot
allotment
allure
Alphonso
Alsace
ambassador
ambuscade
ambush
Amelia
amuse
amusement
Anglicize (also Anglicise)
Anglo
Anglo-Saxon
Anglophile
Anglophone
Archibald
arrange
arrangement
array
attach
attachment
attaché
attack
attire
auberge
Audrey
avant-garde
avant-gardism

B

babillard
baboon
bacon
badge
baggage
balcony
baldric
Baldwin
bale
ballon
balloon
ballot
ballottement
banal
banality
band "flat strip"
band "group"
bandage
bandeau
bandit
bandolier
bandy
banish
bank "financial institution"
bankrupt
bankruptcy
bannimus
banlieue
banner
banquet
banquette
bargain
baron
baroness
baronet
barrel
barren
bastard
bastardize
baste
bastide
Bastille
bastion
bateau (also batteau)
bawd
bawdy
beak
beaker
beggar
beignet
belfry
berm
Bertha
Bianca
bichon
bigot
bigotry
bison
bivouac
blanch
Blanche
blancmange
blank
blanket
blasé (also blase)
blazon
blemish
bleu
bliaut
blister
bloc
block
blockade
blond
blonde
blouse
bludgeon
blue
boast
bobbin
bocce
bondage
bonnet
boot
booty
bordello
border
boss "button, bump"
botany
boudoir
bouffant
boulevard
boulevardier
bouquet
bourgeois (also burgeois)
bourgeoise
bourgeoisie
boutonniere
brach
brachet
bracket
braggart
braise
brandish
brawn
braze
brazier
bream
breccia
bric-a-brac
brick
bridoon
brioche
briquette
brisk
broil "to cook"
broil "to quarrel"
brose
browse
brulee
brunet
brunette
Bruno
brush "dust sweeper; hairbrush"
brush "shrubbery, underbrush"
brusque
Brussels
bucket
buffer
buffet "to strike"
buffet "table"
buffoon
buoy
buoyance
buoyancy
buoyant
burette
burgeon
burgess
burglar
burglarize (also burglarise)
burglary
Burgundy
burin
burnish
busk
butcher
butt (of a joke)
butt "to hit with the head"
butte
button
buttress

C

cahoot (also cahoots)
Camembert
camerlengo
camouflage
can-can
canard
cantankerous
Carlos
Carolina
caroline
Carolingian
carouse
carousal
carp (fish)
carte blanche
Casablanca
casserole
Catalan
chagrin
chamberlain
chamois
charabanc
Charlemagne
Charles
charlotte
chemise
cheval de frise
chic
chicane
chicanery
chiffon
chiffonade
chiffonier
choice
claque
cliche (also cliché)
clique
cloak
cloche
Clovis
coach
coat
cockade
cockaigne
cocotte
coif
coiffeur
coiffure
cologne
condom
Conrad
contraband
contraption
coquette
corvette
coterie
cotillion
cottage
cramp
cranny
crap
cratch "creche"
cravat
crawfish
crayfish
creche
creek
cricket
croquet
croquette
crotch
crouch
croup
crow (crowbar)
crowbar
cruet
crush
cry
cuff

D

dance
dart
debauch
debauchery
deboshed
debris
debut
debutante
decry
deforestation
defray
delay
demarcation
derange
detach
develop
development
disarray
disband
disease
disenfranchise
disengage
disguise
dislodge
dismay
drab
drape
drapery
droll
drug
dune
dungeon

E

ease
easy
eclat (also éclat)
egret
elope
embassy
emblazon
emblement
emboss
embrasure
embroider
embroil
enamel
encroach
enfranchise
engage
engagement
engrave
engross
enhance
enrich
entrap
envelop
envelope
equerry
equip
Ermentrude
ermine
escarpment
eschew
escrow
espionage
-esque
etiquette

F

falcon
faubourg
Fauve
Fauviast
fee
felon
felony
Ferdinand
feud
feudal
feuter, fewter
fiasco
fie
filbert
filibuster
filter
flagon
flamenco
flamingo
flan
flâneur
flange
flank
flask
flatter
flinch
flock "tuft of wool"
floss
flotilla
flotsam
flounder (fish)
forage
foray
forest
forestation
forester
forestry
forcené
framboise
franc
Frances
franchise
Francis
Franciscan
Franco-
Franglais
frank
frankincense
Franklin
franklin
frappe
fray (feeling of alarm)
Frederick
fresco
frisk
frizz
frock
frounce
fry (young fish)
fur
furbish
furnish
furniture

G

gabardine
gable
gadget
gaffe
gaiety
gain
gainstrive
gaiter
gala
gallant
gallantry
gallimaufry
gallivant
gallop
garage
garb
garbage
garçon
garden
gardenia
garibaldi
garland
garment
garner
garnish
garret
garrison
garrote
gasket
gauche
gaudy
gauge
Gaul
gaunt
gauntlet
gay
Geoffrey
Gerald
Gerard
Gertrude
ghetto
gibbet
gibbon
giblets
gigolo
Gilbert
gimlet
gleek (game of cards)
gnocchi
goblin
Godfrey
gonfalon
gopher
Goth
goth
gothic
gourmand
gourmet
grape
grapnel
grappa
grapple
grate (verb)
greaves
grimace
grippe
Griselda
grizzle
grocer
grocery
grommet
gross
grouch
group
growl
grudge
gruel
guarantee
guard
guardian
Guelph
guerdon
Guernsey
guerrilla
guidance
guide
guidon
guile
guimpe
guise
guy "rope"
guy
gyrfalcon

H

haggard
haggis
halberd
hale "to drag, summon"
halt "stop"
halyard
hamlet
hamper "large basket"
hanaper
hangar
harangue
harass
harassment
harbinger
hardy
harlequin
harlot
harness
harpoon
harpsichord
harridan
hash
haste
hasty
hatch "to mark with lines"
hatchet
hauberk
haughty
haul
haunch
haunt
haut cuisine
hautboy
hauteur
Havana
havoc
hawser
heinous
helmet
Henry
herald
Herbert
heron
hideous
hobbledehoy
hockey
hod
hodgepodge
hoe
hollandaise
Howard
Hubert
huge
Hugh
Huguenot
hurt
hurtle
hut
hutch

I
infiltrate
install
installment

J

jangle
jape
jersey
jibe
jig
Jocelin
jolly

K
kestrel

L

label
lai
Lambert
lampoon
Lancelot
lanyard
lattice
lawn
lay "short song"
lease
lecher
lecherous
Leonard
Leopold
leotard
lessee
leud
Lewis
lickerish
liege
lingua franca
list
lobby
locket
lodge
loggia
logistics
loin
Lombard
loop (metallurgy) "hot bloom"
Lorraine
lothario
lottery
lotto
Louis
loupe
louver
lowboy
luff
luge
lurch (in games)
lure

M

mackerel
mail "post"
maim
malinger
malkin
mangle
mannequin
maraud
marauder
march "walk, stride"
march "botder"
Marcomanni
margrave
marmoset
marmot
marque
marquee
marquis
marshal
marten
mascara
mask
mason
masque
masquerade
massacre
Matilda
Maud
mayhem
meringue
merlin
Merovingian
mignon
Milicent
minion
mis- (in French words)
mitten
moat
mock
mooch
morass
morel
morganatic
mortgage
motley
moue
mousse
mow "scornful look"
muffle
murdrum
muse
mushroom

N
nonsense
Nordic
Norman
nouveau riche

O

oboe
Oliver
ordalian
ordalium
orgillous
orgulous
Orlando
osier
Ostrogoth

P

packet
pall-mall
park
parquet
patch "clown, fool"
patois
patrol
patten
paw
pawn "something left as security"
perform
picaresque
piccolo
picket
picnic
pike "weapon"
pinch
piquant
pique
pirouette
pitcher "jug"
placard
plaque
plat
plate
plateau
platform
platinum
platitude
platter
pledge
poach "to push, poke"
poach "to cook in liquid"
pocket
poke "sack"
poltroon
potpourri
pottage
pouch
pouf
pulley

Q
quail
queasy
quiche
quiver "case for arrows"

R

rabbit
race "lineage"
racist
raffish
raffle
raiment
ramp
rampage
rampant
ranch
random
range
ranger
rank "order, position"
rapier
rasp
raspberry
ratchet
rave
Raymond
rearrange
rebuff
rebuke
rebut
rebuttal
refresh
refurbish
regain
regard
Reginald
regret
regroup
rehash
relay
remark
replevin
retire
retouch
reverie
reward
reynard
rhyme
ribald
ribbon
Richard
riches
ricochet
riffraff
rifle "firearm"
rifle "to plunder"
rink
rinse
riot
rivet
roach "small fish"
roan
roast
rob
robe
Robert
rocket "projectile"
Roderick
Roger
rogue
Roland
Rolf
romp
rotisserie
rubbish
rubble
ruffian
rummage
Russia

S

saber
sable
sabotage
sackbut
sacre bleu
safeguard
salon
saloon
savate
Saxon
scabbard
scaffold
scaffolding
scale (of a fish or reptile)
scallop
Scandinavian
scaramouche
scarf "strip of cloth"
scarp
scavage
scavenge
scavenger
scherzo
scion
scorn
screen
scrimmage
scroll
scrum
scupper
scrutinize
scrutiny
seise
seize
seizure
seneschal
sense
shock
sirloin
skate
skew
skewbald
skiff
skirmish
slash
slat
slate
slender
slice
sloop
slot "track, trail"
sobriquet
soil "to make dirty"
soil "a wallow"
soke
sopaipilla
sorrel "reddish brown"
sorrel (plant)
sound "to fathom, probe"
soup
souse
spate
spavin
spell
spelt (wheat)
spool
spy
staccato
stale "lure, decoy"
stall "to delay"
stallion
stampede
standard
staple "mainstay"
stay "prop, support"
stockade
stour "conflict"
stout
strand "string, fiber"
strife
strive
stucco
stuff
sturgeon
sully
sup "to dine"
supper
surcoat
Swabian
Swiss

T

tabard
tack
taco
tampion
tampon
tan
tannin
tap
target
tarnish
tass
teat
tedesco
tetchy
Teutonic
Theobald
Theodric
Tibert
tick "credit"
ticket
tier
till "cashbox"
tirade
tire "wheel"
toccata
tocsin
touch
touché
touchy
toupee
towel
track
trampoline
trap "owndom, personal belongings"
trappings
treacherous
treachery
trebuchet
triage
trial
trialist
trick
tricot
trill
trip
troak
troll "to stroll"
trolley
trollop
trombone
trompe l'oeil
troop
trot
troupe
trump "to deceive, cheat"
trump "horn"
trumpery
trumpet
try
tryst
tuffet
tuft
tumbrel
tunnel
turbot

U

Ulster
unafraid
unattached
unblemished
unbutton
underbrush
undeveloped
undisguised
uneasy
unflattering
unfurnished
unguarded
unmask
untouchable
unwarranted

V

vagrant
vandal
vanguard
Varangian
veneer
vermouth
Visigoth
vogue

W

wad
wafer
wage "payment"
wage "bet"
wager
waif
wait
waiter
waive
Waldensian
wallet
Walloon
wallop
Walter
war
warble
warden
warder
wardrobe
warmonger
warrant "defender"
warrant "to keep safe"
warranty
warren
warrior
warship
waste "to spoil, squander"
waste "desolate area"
wastrel
wayment
wicket
wile
William
wince
wreck

Z
zig-zag

See also
Lists of English words by country or language of origin
List of English words of French origin
List of French words of Germanic origin
List of Germanic and Latinate equivalents in English
Anglish (Linguistic purism in English)

Notes

References
Online Etymology Dictionary. 
Auguste Brachet, An Etymological Dictionary of the French Language: Third Edition
Centre National de Ressources Textuelles et Lexicales 
Dictionary.com. 
Diez, An Etymological Dictionary of the Romance Languages

Lists of English words of foreign origin
English Latinate